Naghar is a small village located in the Bageshwar district in the Indian state of Uttarakhand.

The population is about 200 and it is administered through the Kanda tehsil.

Although some villagers still farm, many have now left for places such as Haldwani, Delhi, and Lucknow in order to find work.

A majority of the village's population is Rajput (Rautela, Padhani and Kalakoti). The Rautela are said to have come from Chhanbillori, a village near Almora. The fifth generation of the Rautela clan now resides in Naghar.  Some scheduled caste families also live there. Most of the villagers are educated and have good jobs.

Naghar is directly connected to Haldwani, Delhi via road. The nearest railway station is Kathgodam, which is about 200 kilometers away. Uttarakhand Transport Corporation’s Delhi-Reema Bus service from Anand Vihar ISBT connects the village with Delhi.  The Kumaun Motor Owner Union (KMOU) provides daily service to Reema at 5 AM from Haldwani.

Villages in Bageshwar district